Blair Cornelia Waldorf (married name Bass) is one of the main characters of Gossip Girl, introduced in the original series of novels and also appearing as the lead in the television adaptation; she also appears in the comic adaptation. Described as "a girl of extremes" by creator Cecily von Ziegesar, she is a New York City socialite and a comical overachiever who possesses both snobbish and sensitive sides. Due to her position as queen bee of Manhattan's social scene, Blair's actions and relations are under constant scrutiny from the mysterious Gossip Girl, a popular blogger.

Leighton Meester, who portrayed the character in the television drama, has described Blair as being insecure about her social status. At times, this anxiety creates flaws and complexities which contribute to character development. In Meester's view, the true Blair is ultimately a good girl at heart.

Blair has been compared to vintage film and literary figures, including Becky Sharp and Lizzie Eustace. She is commonly likened to Lila Fowler of Francine Pascal's Sweet Valley High series. Meester's portrayal has also drawn comparisons to roles played by Joan Collins and Audrey Hepburn. She is the most critically acclaimed character of the franchise, while the television character has drawn real-life attention surrounding fashion and her love life.

Character in print
Gossip Girl is a series of novels about socially prominent young adults in New York City. The story primarily follows Blair Waldorf and her best friend Serena van der Woodsen during their years in high school and college. Due to her fame on the Upper East Side, Blair is featured on the website of "Gossip Girl," an anonymous gossip blogger whose posts appear occasionally throughout the story.

Novel series
In the first book, Blair is introduced as a privileged, comically vain overachiever. She is described as an alluring brunette, and occasionally models her appearance and demeanor after famous actresses, including Marilyn Monroe and, most often, Audrey Hepburn. In early novels, the character is also written as bulimic.

Blair is largely motivated by matters surrounding family, romance, and ambition. However, her tendency to overachieve can lead to feelings of paranoia, with dramatic or comical results. In a review for The New Yorker, Janet Malcolm remarked that Blair's issues made her "both a broader caricature and a more real person" than the other Gossip Girl characters. In a 2009 interview, Gossip Girl creator Cecily von Ziegesar claimed to identify with Blair the most, stating, "She is so unpredictable and dramatic. Such a bitch, but we understand why she is a bitch and we like her anyway".

Story lines
Throughout most of the series' run, Blair grapples with a number of changes within her family. One year prior to the opening novel, Blair's parents divorced after her father ran off with another man. When her mother remarries, and her father leaves the country, Blair has difficulty accepting her stepfather, Cyrus Rose. In addition, her stress over these matters occasionally affects her other relationships. However, Blair ultimately remains close to her father Harold, who she often turns to for comfort. By contrast, she maintains a somewhat tenser relationship with her mother Eleanor. It is also revealed that Blair has struggled with bulimia.

In the opening novel, Blair learns of an affair between her friend Serena van der Woodsen and her boyfriend Nate. This marks the beginning of the story's primary love triangle, which recurs throughout the series. Blair's romantic life has various effects on her character development. After Nate repeatedly hurts her, she eventually refuses to take him back until she believes in his ability to commit to her. In pursuing Nate, however, Blair herself cheats on her new boyfriend Pete, which results in her losing both of them. She eventually begins to acknowledge her mistakes, with her father's help. She later grows closer to Chuck Bass (which initially occurred in the series' television adaptation), who she'd previously known for years, which leads them to briefly date one another.

Blair is noted for an over-achieving nature, which often appears in humorous scenes. In a review for New York magazine, Emily Nussbaum lauded one of Blair's fantasies, which involves "joining the Peace Corps, getting a killer tan, winning the Nobel Peace Prize, and having dinner with the president, 'who would then write her a recommendation to Yale, and then Yale would fall all over themselves to accept her.' " The New Yorker Janet Malcolm remarked that unlike some of her forerunners in film and literature, "Blair already has all the money and position anyone could want. She is pure naked striving, restlessly seeking an object, any object, and never knowing when enough is enough."

Blair encounters a setback during her interview at Yale by revealing the recent stress in her life, and then kissing her interviewer on the cheek upon dismissal. Her father then makes a donation to the school, though Blair is still wait-listed. In the twelfth book, I Will Always Love You, it is revealed that she has been admitted to the university.

In addition to her feelings for Nate, Blair is sometimes said to feel competitive with Serena in other areas, including matters of beauty and popularity. This also leads to an occasional envy on Blair's part. It is unclear how much of Blair's perception of Serena is in line with reality; the narrative describes both characters as "hands down the two hottest girls on the Upper East Side, and maybe all of Manhattan, or even the whole world."

Manga series

In 2010, Yen Press began publishing a manga adaptation titled Gossip Girl: For Your Eyes Only, written and illustrated by HyeKyung Baek. This series adapts notable scenarios from the novel—including the triangle with Nate and Serena—but also features new material.

After losing her position as queen bee, Blair attempts to regain her former status while adjusting to a less privileged lifestyle. In addition to this series, Blair also appears in a manga adaptation of the novel Gossip Girl: Psycho Killer, a parody of horror stories.

Television series
In 2007, Gossip Girl was adapted for television. According to Cecily von Ziegesar, the television character is largely faithful to the original. Among the aspects to be maintained are her admiration for Audrey Hepburn and her interest in Yale University. However, the series is also noted for its deviations from the source material, including the exclusion of Blair's brother Tyler. The show also explores romances between Blair and multiple male leads, resulting in occasional love triangles. In the fifth season, Blair is revealed to be pregnant with Prince of Monaco, Louis Grimaldi's child. However the child later dies before birth after a car crash Blair and Chuck were in.

Among fans and the media, Blair's bond with Chuck Bass was commonly known by the portmanteau "Chair", while her relationship with Dan Humphrey was referred to as “Dair”. The nicknames and viewer interest in these relationships were recognized by the show's producers.

Casting

To prepare for the part of Blair, actress Leighton Meester, a natural blonde, dyed her hair brown before auditioning, and also studied the first novel. She has described the character as multi-faceted, labeling her "a little bit of everything which is pretty amazing." Like von Ziegesar, Meester has also claimed to relate to Blair on certain levels. Prior to the show's debut in 2007, the actress stated that, "The only way to play Blair, or any character, and make her human, is to find what she is inside me. And I know I have my insecurities, too." She went on to say that, "The way Blair and I are not alike when it comes to insecurities is: She pays so much attention to hers!" Meester's casting was described by Yahoo! as a star-making role which moved her "into the pop culture vanguard," while Cecily von Ziegesar has called her a perfect choice.

In December 2010, Meester revealed plans to leave the show in 2012. E! Online and other outlets speculated that her departure would possibly mark the end of the series.

Season 1

In  of Gossip Girl, Blair is introduced as the Upper East Side's beautiful and popular queen bee. She is the daughter of Eleanor Waldorf, a famous fashion designer. She is dating Nate Archibald, and is best friends with Serena van der Woodsen. She also finds a close companion in Nate's best friend and her childhood friend Chuck Bass, who becomes a partner for her schemes. When Serena returns home from boarding school, Blair learns from Nate that he lost his virginity to a drunken Serena over a year ago. Blair retaliates by publicly revealing Serena's connection to a rehab hospital. She then learns that the actual patient is Serena's younger brother, Eric, who had been committed after a suicide attempt. Afterward, a remorseful Blair reconciles with Serena.

After learning that Nate no longer loves her, Blair sleeps with Chuck, eventually falling for him. This leads to a heated affair and an eventual love triangle. Her inability to choose creates much of the first season's story line. There are brief mentions of Blair's past struggle with bulimia.

She also begins a brief power struggle with freshman Jenny Humphrey. After she unites with Chuck and Nate in order to save Serena from the scheming Georgina Sparks, Chuck realizes that his feelings for Blair are real and suggests that they spend the summer together in Tuscany. However, he is discouraged by his father at the last minute, and stands Blair up.

Season 2
At the launch of the second season, Blair was described by creators as the queen at the center of the Gossip Girl chess game. A large portion of her story line in  revolves around her love-hate relationship with Chuck Bass, which was labeled "the heart of GG" by People magazine. While competing with Serena, Blair forms an unexpected friendship with Jenny, who states that they each work for everything they achieve, while Serena often glides through life. During their interviews at Yale University, Blair and Serena apologize for their ill feelings and resume their friendship.

In the episode "O Brother, Where Bart Thou?", Chuck is devastated by news of his father's death, prompting Blair to offer her support while telling Chuck that she loves him. He initially shuns her advances, but later turns to her for comfort. However, the two stop seeing each other due to Chuck's uncle, Jack Bass, convincing him he has an inability to commit to a relationship. After being rejected by Yale, Blair finds unexpected encouragement from Nate. She is later accepted into New York University, and her competitive relationship with Georgina is eventually renewed.

As the season ends, Blair crowns Jenny the new queen of Constance Billard School. In the season finale, it is discovered that Blair slept with Chuck's uncle Jack and that Chuck had slept with Vanessa Abrams. Chuck then departs for Europe. He later returns to New York and reconciles with Blair while declaring his love for her, and the two finally begin a committed relationship.

Season 3
In the third season, Blair joins Vanessa, Georgina, and Jenny's brother Dan at NYU. Much of her storyline concerns her inability to attain her previous status at her new school. She finds emotional support from her mother, as well as Chuck. However, she and Chuck separate once again when Blair feels that he manipulated her while competing with his uncle (Chuck made a deal with Jack that Blair could sleep with him and in exchange, Chuck gets his hotel back that Jack initially stole to 'destroy Chuck').

She later transfers to Columbia University, and learns that an emotionally reformed Chuck was responsible for her enrollment. They later team up as part of a role-playing scheme to help Serena's mother and Chuck's adopted mother, Lily. In the season finale, Chuck attempts to propose to Blair, but is interrupted by Dan, who reveals that Chuck had slept with Jenny. Two weeks later, Blair and Serena depart for Paris intending to spend the summer together.

Season 4
In  Blair and Chuck become competitive once again, but eventually resume their sexual relations before recognizing their love for one another. When the relationship interferes with their business interests, she and Chuck break up once more. Chuck promises he'll wait for her, and both affirm their belief that their love will reunite them in the end.

Blair then teams up with Dan when the two share common goals. They also end up working together at W. magazine, where friction develops between the two. On Valentine's Day, she discovers that Chuck has romantic feelings for Raina Thorpe, the daughter of his business rival. Later, she and Dan spend the evening talking on their cell phones while watching Rosemary's Baby. Blair later quits W. and is shown asleep with Dan in his Brooklyn flat. Later, upon growing curious of their feelings for one another, Blair and Dan share a kiss before the mid-season hiatus.

Blair eventually decides that she wants to be with Chuck, but shuns him once again after he tries to humiliate Dan. She is later courted by a prince from Monaco named Louis. During a private confrontation, a drunken Chuck punches a window after he finds out Prince Louis has proposed to Blair, which cuts Blair's face as it shatters. Afterward, Blair chooses to accept a proposal from Louis. Blair later attempts to warn Chuck about potential trouble in his family. She is then abducted by an enemy of the Basses, Raina's father Russell Thorpe. Chuck later rescues Blair and apologizes for his violent actions. Following a night out together, the two have sex before Chuck advises Blair to return to Louis, believing that she will be happier with him. However, the season ends with the revelation that Blair may be pregnant.

Reaction to triangle

Amidst the fourth season, the romance between Dan and Blair became a polarizing topic among viewers which also drew significant media interest. Jarett Wieselman of the New York Post applauded the development, feeling that Blair had "more chemistry" with Dan than with Chuck. Tierney Bricker of E! ranked all 25 Gossip Girl couples placing 'Dair' as the third best couple after Blair and Serena (#1) and 'Chair' (#2).

Dawn Fallik of The Wall Street Journal was less positive, asserting that "both characters have been so Blandified that there's no fun left in the show." A writer for E! Online's Team WWK labeled the Dan/Blair relationship "nomance nonsense".

With regard to Chuck and Blair, Meester stated, "I can really relate to it—not necessarily because it's this dramatic, tumultuous relationship, but because the way they love each other is very real, and not for the sake of being dramatic. It's actual love. There's nobody for each other but them." Meester also expressed fondness for Dan and Blair, however, stating, "I think they're good for each other in a lot of ways, in a way that Chuck and Blair aren't." Badgley claimed that he thought "Blair [was] Dan's soul mate" but that Blair's soulmate was Chuck “because Blair and Chuck belong with each other, obviously.” He further stated that he thought the Blair and Dan storyline was "the most exciting for Dan as a person".

According to producer Joshua Safran, the outcome wasn't necessarily decided ahead of time. "One thing we are very conscious of—and I know some fans get upset about this—is we really try to treat the characters as living, breathing, well-rounded individuals. And we're often surprised by where their journeys take them; they open new doors for us all the time," he said.

Controversy

In response to these comments, Carina MacKenzie of Zap2it stated, "We're left wondering if Safran missed the part where she went home bleeding because Chuck was using physical intimidation to release his own emotions." While reviewing the episode, Tierney Bricker of Zap2it felt that there were "really no excuses for Chuck Bass anymore." MacKenzie also called the show's explanation "disturbing, particularly given the young, female target demographic of Gossip Girl and The CW."

In a review for the Los Angeles Times, Judy Berman addressed Safran's description of Blair during the scene. "Considering how terrified Blair looked at the end of their encounter, and how quickly she got out of there, the show is sending a mixed message at best." She went on to state, "We have no right to expect Gossip Girl to be a paragon of morality, or even realism, but the idea that true love requires taking a shard of glass to the face is disturbing even in this alternate, soap-opera dimension."

Season 5
In the fifth-season premiere, Blair continues to plan her wedding, but begins to encounter problems in her relationship with Louis. It is later revealed that she is pregnant. Blair tells Chuck that the child is Louis', and states that part of her wanted Chuck to be the father. Dan becomes Blair's confidante and is shown to be in love with her, though she remains oblivious to his feelings and states that there is nothing more than friendship between them.

Though she insists that she is in love with Louis, Blair begins to seek Chuck out as the season progresses. The two eventually declare their love for each other prior to a car accident in her limousine while being chased by paparazzi. Though both recover, Blair suffers a miscarriage from the crash. After the crash Blair decides that she must commit herself to Louis, converting to Catholicism and cutting off any connection with Chuck. At the wedding, Gossip Girl releases a recording of Blair confessing her love for Chuck. Nevertheless, Louis and Blair get married, making Blair a Princess of Monaco, though Louis informs her that they will have a loveless marriage of convenience. She then receives support from Dan, leading them to share   a kiss on Valentine's Day. Amidst these developments, Blair grows conflicted between her feelings for Dan and Chuck. After taking steps to end her marriage, she chooses to pursue a relationship with Dan. By the end of the season, however, after a debate about which love is the best, Blair declares that she is still in love with Chuck, and chooses to pursue him.

Season 6
In the final season, Blair resumes her romantic relationship with Chuck, while Chuck and his father Bart—who is revealed to be alive in the previous season—become bitter rivals. Blair pursues her career as head of Waldorf Designs, with several mishaps, before staging a successful line. In the penultimate episode, Bart falls to his death while trying to attack Chuck atop a building. Afterward, Blair and Chuck depart together. In the series finale, Blair marries Chuck which results in her not having to testify against him in his father's murder case. Five years later, Blair is shown to be running her mother's successful fashion line and she works with Jenny in a line called "J for Waldorf", and she and Chuck are shown to have a son named Henry.

Reception

In print
While covering the book series, Janet Malcolm of The New Yorker labeled the character "an antiheroine of the first rank," and asserted that "the series belongs to awful Blair, who inspires von Ziegesar's highest flights of comic fancy." She also compared Blair to vintage film and literary figures such as Becky Sharp of Vanity Fair, and Lizzie Eustace of The Eustace Diamonds. In addition, several critics have likened Blair to the character Lila Fowler of the earlier Sweet Valley High series.

In the 2007 book Children's Literature and Culture, writer Harry Edwin Eiss chastised the depiction of Blair's bulimia. "If handled properly, the inclusion of her illness could have provided a powerful lesson for young adult readers who worry about their weight and food consumption. Unfortunately, Cecily von Ziegesar, the author of the series, presents a seriously flawed treatment of the problem. In a failed attempt at humor, the writer regards Blair's sickness as just another source of gossip," he said. Emily Nussbaum of New York magazine had similar comments, calling the bulimia "more of an icky weakness than a full-fledged pathology." However, she went on to commend Blair as "hilariously self-centered".

Julie Opipari of Manga Maniac Cafe gave the initial Gossip Girl manga a negative review, citing displeasure with the characters and plot. However, she acknowledged that this gave her a greater appreciation for Blair in the second volume, noting that Blair "really had to learn how to rough it" after losing her privileged lifestyle. She went on to state that "Blair is one character that is fun to hate on. So imagine my surprise when I actually started to like her by the end of the book".

On screen

The show's breakout character, Blair Waldorf has garnered much media recognition. Yahoo! proclaims Blair a member of "television's pantheon of razor-witted, solipsistic high school Alpha females." While commenting on Meester, New York magazine's 2008 cover story of the series states, "Her villain-you-want-to-root-for is the most sophisticated performance on the show." In another 2008 article, People magazine commented that "Meester has burst out of this ensemble to stardom." Variety described her performance as similar to that of "a predatory junior Joan Collins who practically breathes fire out of her pinched, perfectly WASP-ish nostrils." FHM Online ranked the actress the "Hottest TV Star" of autumn 2008, stating that as Blair Waldorf, "Leighton Meester has stolen the spotlight with her mind-blowing good looks and amazing performance." OK! magazine likened her character to Audrey Hepburn's portrayal of Holly Golightly. The physical similarity was also noted by USA Today.

In its 2009 "Hot List", Rolling Stone cited Blair as "the reason we love the back-stabby soap most." Regarding the fictional fame of Blair's friend Serena, Tim Stack of Entertainment Weekly asserted that "Serena may be the star of the media but Blair is quickly becoming the star of this show." While citing Serena's long-revered allure, Glamour and its readers compared the two characters in 2008, with Blair being recognized as more beautiful than Serena. In a review from The Atlantic, Blair and Serena's friendship was praised as "it offered a relationship whose depth and complexity approached Rory and Paris' [from Gilmore Girls]."

In May 2009, Blair received attention from Forbes, which interviewed her via the series' writers. Television Without Pity listed Meester in their "Golden Globes 2009: Overlooked TV Shows and Performances" article, labeling Blair "so multi-faceted, well-dressed and beautifully played that she elevates this teen soap to something we don't even feel guilty about admitting we love." Meester won the Teen Choice Award for "Choice TV Actress Drama" in 2009, and again in 2010. In 2009, she was voted the "Best Mean Girl" in Zap2it first poll of the best television characters in the 2000s. In February 2012, Zap2it held another poll to determine TV's Most Crushworthy. Blair was elected TV's Most Crushworthy 1% Female over Temperance "Bones" Brennan. The 1 percenters are people that "have everything going for them with their fantastic good looks and their opulent lifestyle". Her relationship with Chuck Bass was included in TV Guide list of "The Best TV Couples of All Time" as well as Entertainment Weekly "30 Best 'Will They/Won't They?' TV Couples".

The character's wardrobe—credited to designers Abigail Lorick and Eric Daman—was popular, earning mentions from periodicals such as InStyle and New York, along with recognition from websites. TV Guide listed Blair among its "Best Dressed TV Characters of 2007". Entertainment Weekly named Blair Waldorf and Chuck Bass the "Most Stylish" characters of 2008. Lifetime television ranks Blair first in its listing of "The Top 10 Best-Dressed TV Characters", while Glamour has named her among its best-dressed TV characters of all time. In a Vanity Fair interview, costume designers Eric Daman and Meredith Markworth-Pollack named Audrey Hepburn and Vogue editor-in-chief Anna Wintour as their inspirations when dressing Meester as Blair. The designers also cited New York socialites Tinsley Mortimer and Arden Wohl as influences. TV Guide named her the sixth most fashionable TV character.

References

Bibliography

Characters in American novels of the 21st century
Female characters in literature
American female characters in television
Fictional bullies
Fictional characters from New York City
Fictional characters with bulimia
Fictional princesses
Fictional Monegasque people
Fictional socialites
Fictional Columbia University people
Gossip Girl characters
Literary characters introduced in 2002
Teenage characters in literature
Teenage characters in television